Schönfließ Dorf  station is a railway station in the Schönfließ district of the municipality of Lebus, located in the Märkisch-Oderland district in Brandenburg, Germany.

References

Railway stations in Brandenburg
Buildings and structures in Märkisch-Oderland